is a rechargeable contactless smart card ticketing system for public transport in Sapporo, Japan. Hokkaidō Railway Company (JR Hokkaidō) introduced the system from October 25 2008. Like other electronic fare collection systems in Japan, the card uses RFID technology developed by Sony corporation known as FeliCa. The card has an official mascot of Ezo momonga (Pteromys volans orii), a kind of flying squirrel found in Hokkaidō. The mascot is designed by Sora, an illustrator who lives in Sapporo.

Usable area
As of 2022, 55 stations in Sapporo area, including unmanned stations, accept Kitaca.
Hakodate Main Line: From Otaru to Iwamizawa
It's planned that Hakodate to Shin-Hakodate-Hokuto, and Iwamizawa to Asahikawa sections will also accept Kitaca by the Spring of 2024
Chitose Line: From Shiroishi to Numanohata, and branch from Minami-Chitose to New Chitose Airport (the whole line)
Muroran Main Line: From Numanohata to Tomakomai
Sasshō Line (Gakuentoshi Line): From Sōen to Hokkaidō-Iryōdaigaku (the whole line)

Types of cards
Unregistered Kitaca
Registered Kitaca: Requires registration. The card can be reissued when lost.
Kitaca commuter pass: Requires registration.
Credit card function is also considered. North Pacific Bank, the largest local bank of Hokkaidō, considers to include Kitaca's functions to its credit card Clover. A plan to introduce an Osaifu-Keitai compliant mobile payment system was cancelled due to the cost.

Integration

Kitaca can be used anywhere that JR East's Suica from spring 2009, including its electronic money function.  Since late 2012, the card can also be used in lieu of a SAPICA, a smart card system introduced by Sapporo City Transportation Bureau from January 2009.

Since 23 March 2013, a national-wide IC card integration service has introduced, supports of TOICA, ICOCA, SUGOCA, PASMO, manaca, PiTaPa (but no electronic money supports), Hayakaken, and nimoca to and from Kitaca lieus are started.

References

External links 
  Official website by JR Hokkaidō
  Official press release by JR Hokkaidō

Fare collection systems in Japan
Contactless smart cards